Robert Ridland (born November 7, 1950) is an American equestrian. He competed in the team jumping event at the 1976 Summer Olympics.

References

External links
 

1950 births
Living people
American male equestrians
Olympic equestrians of the United States
Equestrians at the 1976 Summer Olympics
Sportspeople from Pasadena, California